Persatuan Sepakbola Kebumen, commonly known as Persak, is an Indonesian football club based in Kebumen Regency, Central Java. They currently compete in the Liga 3.

History
Persak Kebumen was founded in 1967 at the wish of the people of Kebumen who wanted a football club in the Kebumen Regency area that could compete in the official Indonesia football competition. In 2008, they started playing in Liga 3 Central Java zone.

Persak Kebumen vacuum from 2009 to 2013, Even though they have been vacuumed, their supporter, namely Bumi Mania, continue to support their club even though they are on hiatus. Bumi Mania is known to be very loyal when it comes to supporting their beloved club, it was proven during the absence of the Persak Kebumen club. And in 2015, the government of Kebumen has stated that it is certain that Persak Kebumen will compete again in the Liga Nusantara (now Liga 3) Central Java zone in 2015.

On 15 May 2014, they started to bounce back after two years of not participating in the official Indonesian League competition. President Director of Persipasi Bekasi at that time, MK Yulianto, tried to revive Persak Kebumen with additional funds from him. But as time passed, he disappeared like there was no news. After MK Yulianto disappeared without any news, a young businessman who cared about football appeared who was concerned about the club's financial condition, with his personal funds, he financed Persak Kebumen in the 2014 Liga Nusantara until the competition was completed.

In 2015, Persak Kebumen has made a revolution. The General Chair has now changed from Mohammad Dahsyat to H. Arif Ainudin ST and the management and management have also changed. they brought in coach Sartono Anwar, then opened and conducted general selections both from within the city and outside the city, which were directly mentored by Sartono Anwar.

Stadium 
Persak Kebumen play their home matches at Chandradimuka Stadium (part of Chandradimuka Sport Complex), located at the Jalan  Arumbinang, Dukuh, Kebumen. Chandradimuka Stadium design adheres to the national standards for stadium design, which is completed with 10,000 individual seats. The stadium is equipped with: a football pitch, national-standard athletics, a dressing room, a health room, a secretariat, and some offices.

References

External links

 
Football clubs in Indonesia
Association football clubs established in 1967
1967 establishments in Indonesia
Football clubs in Central Java
Kebumen Regency